The Crater-class cargo ship were converted EC2-S-C1 type, Liberty cargo ships, constructed by the United States Maritime Commission (USMC) for use by the US Navy during World War II.

The class was named for the lead ship of its type, with most ships in the class being named for astronomical bodies. Its 65 hulls were among the largest US Navy cargo ship classes.

The ships were propelled by a reciprocating steam engine using a single screw with a power of  shaft.

Notable incidents
USS Aludra (AK-72) 	Lost in action from Japanese torpedo on 23 June 1943 south of Makira island.
USS Deimos (AK-78) 	Damaged by torpedo, 23 June 1943, then abandoned and scuttled south of Makira island.

References

External links
 AK — Cargo Ships—Ships of the U.S. Navy, 1940–1945.

Auxiliary ship classes of the United States Navy
 
 Crater class cargo ship